Holy Rood Church, Ossington is a parish church in the Church of England in Ossington, Nottinghamshire.

The church is Grade I listed by the Department for Digital, Culture, Media and Sport as a building of outstanding architectural or historic interest.

History
The church was built from 1782 to 1783 by John Carr of York. It is thought to stand on, or very near to, the original site of Ossington Preceptory: a monastery of the Knights Hospitallers which was dissolved in 1534 as part of King Henry VIII's dissolution of the monasteries.

Pipe Organ

The church has a barrel organ by Robson dating from around 1830. It has been awarded a Historic Organ Certificate by the British Institute of Organ Studies which has awarded it a Grade I listing. Details of the organ can be found on the National Pipe Organ Register.

Current parish status
It is in a group of parishes which includes:
St. Andrew's Church, Caunton
St. Giles' Church, Cromwell
Holy Rood Church, Ossington
St. Laurence's Church, Norwell

Sources

Church of England church buildings in Nottinghamshire
Churches completed in 1783
Grade I listed churches in Nottinghamshire
1783 establishments in England